This is an overview of the 2006 Iranian Assembly of Experts election in Tehran Province.

The voter turnout was declared 47% in the constituency.

Results

Notes and references

2006 elections in Iran
Elections in Tehran
2000s in Tehran